Mesnières-en-Bray (literally Mesnières in Bray) is a commune in the Seine-Maritime department in the Normandy region in northern France. The town is the origin of the Scottish name Menzies.

Geography

Heraldry

Population

Places of interest
 The chateau, built by Louis de Boissay in the 15th century. It was badly damaged in a fire in 2004.
 The church of Saint-Pierre & Saint-Paul, dating from the eleventh century.
 The old railway line, now a popular ramblers path.

See also
Communes of the Seine-Maritime department

References

External links

 Article about the chateau fire in 2004 
Website of the Regional forestry and farming College 

Communes of Seine-Maritime